Beautiful Creatures is a 2009 American young adult novel written by authors Kami Garcia and Margaret Stohl and the first book in the Caster Chronicles series. The book was published on December 1, 2009, by Little, Brown, and Company. In the UK, Beautiful Creatures is published by Penguin Books. 

On January 3, 2013, a new edition of the novel was published, featuring images from the movie on the cover. The book was written in 12 weeks, inspired by a dare (a bet with 7 kids the authors knew) and was never intended to be published.

Characters
Ethan Lawson Wate is the 16 year old narrator of the novel. He is a high school boy from the fictional town of Gatlin, South Carolina. Though he is not a Caster himself, he somehow has the ability to protect Lena from powerful magic and Dark Casters. He and Lena share a connection called Kelting, which lets them communicate telepathically, even if they are miles away. 
Lena Duchannes is a Caster who appears in Ethan's dreams before moving to Gatlin. She must be claimed for either Light or Dark on her sixteenth birthday.
Sarafine Duchannes is Lena's mother and the strongest Dark Caster. She tries to convince Lena to become a Dark Caster.
Macon Melchizedek Ravenwood is Lena's uncle. He is an Incubus who chooses to live off dreams rather than blood. While characters in the book compare him to Boo Radley, he is described by the writers in an interview with Boys with Books, as an "Atticus Finch of badasses".
Genevieve Duchannes was the Caster who caused the curse in Lena's family by trying to bring her dead fiancé, Ethan Carter Wate, back to life using the Book of Moons. She was likely a Natural.
Ethan Carter Wate was Genevieve's fiancé who died when he was shot during the great burning of Gatlin. Genevieve tried to bring him back to life by using the Book of Moons, which led to her turning Dark. However, Ethan was only revived for a few moments before dying again.
Ridley Duchannes is Lena's cousin and a Dark Caster. She can manipulate people using a lollipop.
Mitchell Wate is Ethan's father, is a reclusive writer deep in mourning for his wife.
Amarie "Amma" Treadeau is a Seer who is like a grandmother to Ethan. She can communicate with her dead family, whom she calls the Greats. Amma is known throughout Gatlin for her culinary skill.
Marian Ashcroft is the librarian of the Mortal and Caster libraries. She was the best friend of Ethan's late mother, Lila Evers Wate, and has known Ethan since he was born. Though she greatly rues it, she cannot help Ethan when he is in danger because she is a Caster librarian and is bound by their rules.
Hunting Phineas Ravenwood is a ruthless incubus and Macon's brother. Unlike Macon, he feeds on blood, which gives him a more youthful appearance.
Lila Ever Wate was Ethan's mother who died a year before the story took place. She was the best friend of the librarian Marian Ashcroft and is hinted to have had a previous relationship with Lena's uncle Macon Ravenwood in the past. She is later revisited by Macon when he is dying.

Plot
Sixteen-year-old Ethan Wate lives in Gatlin, South Carolina, with his widowed father. Lena Duchannes is a mysterious girl with magical powers who appears in Ethan's recurring nightmares. Though she initially rebuffs his attempts at interacting with her, they eventually become friends despite harassment from other classmates that almost gets her expelled. Lena's uncle Macon Ravenwood also attempts to keep Ethan and Lena apart to protect them. Every member of Lena's family is a "Caster" with magical powers. On Lena's sixteenth birthday, she will be "claimed" as either a Light or Dark Caster, but she is terrified of becoming an evil Dark Caster.

Meanwhile, Ethan discovers a locket at Greenbrier plantation, that induces visions of Lena's ancestor Genevieve Duchannes and Ethan's ancestor Ethan Carter Wate, who were engaged during the Civil War. Through the locket, they discover that Genevieve tried to resurrect Ethan Carter Wate using the magical Book of Moons. Due to Genevieve's use of the spell, the Book has the ability to determine which of the Duchannes will be Light or Dark. Ethan and Lena find the Book of Moons in Genevieve's grave and study it for ways to prevent Lena from becoming Dark. Furthermore, Lena is continuously spiritually attacked by a Dark Caster named Sarafine, who is actually her mother. While the Duchannes cannot prevent the attacks, Ethan's presence seems to stop them.

Lena's sixteenth birthday is celebrated by Ethan, the Duchannes, and her classmates. Macon forbids Lena to attend the party set up by her classmates, but Lena sneaks out anyway and confesses her love to Ethan, who reciprocates. Sarafine reveals herself at the party, accompanied by incubus Hunting Ravenwood. Sarafine tells Lena that she will be able to Claim herself for the Dark or Light at midnight. If she chooses to go Dark, all the Light Casters in her family will die, but she would be able to have a previously-impossible physical relationship with Ethan. If she chooses to go Light, all the Dark Casters in her family will die, including Macon. A fight occurs, culminating in Sarafine escaping and Hunting nearly killing Macon. After Ethan gathers the other Duchannes for help, Ethan searches for Lena, but instead meets Sarafine, who kills him. At midnight, Lena uses her power over nature to block out the moonlight, preventing her from being claimed. She negotiates with Amma and then recites a spell from the Book of Moons to resurrect Ethan. The spell works, but at what cost?

Reception
Kirkus Reviews writes that "Ethan's wry narrative voice will resonate with readers of John Green as well as the hordes of supernatural-romance fans looking for the next book to sink their teeth into". Booklist also positively reviewed the book, stating "there's plenty teens will like: romance, magic, hauntings, and the promise of more to come." The School Library Journal praised Beautiful Creatures's "detailed descriptions" and "satisfying conclusion", writing that it would appeal to fans of True Blood. Publishers Weekly criticized the book's "protracted climax" but wrote that Beautiful Creatures had a "compelling and dimensional mythology". Despite its use of magic, the book is praised for its "authentic" characters and world. Linda Perez of the Journal of Adolescent & Adult Literacy states "Stohl writes clearly and lyrically," "the world they've created... is so believable that readers will find themselves unwittingly believing in magic". According to Ilene Cooper of Booklist "the 600 pages could have been cut to make a tight, better story".

Accolades
The series was named one of MTV News's "series to watch" in 2010.

Adaptations

Film

Alcon Entertainment, with 3 Arts Entertainment and Belle Pictures, produced a 2013 movie version for Warner Bros., adapted and directed by Richard LaGravenese, starring Alden Ehrenreich and Alice Englert as Ethan Wate and Lena Duchannes and Jeremy Irons, Viola Davis, Emma Thompson, and Emmy Rossum in supporting roles. The film was released on February 14, 2013. The film received mixed reviews and was a box office disappointment.

Beautiful Creatures: The Official Illustrated Movie Companion by Mark Cotta Vaz, was published in the UK by Penguin Books on 2 January 2013, as a Puffin Paperback.

Comic book
Yen Press announced in 2012 it was adapting Beautiful Creatures into manga format, with artist Cassandra Jean.

Music
Martin Mazanek Lena (2016 Symphonic Poem) 
Inspired by book Beautiful Creatures (by Kami Garcia and Margaret Stohl)

Sequels
Beautiful Creatures was signed by Little, Brown, and Company for a four-book series, the Caster Chronicles, with the follow-up books titled:
Beautiful Darkness (2010)
Beautiful Chaos (2011)
Beautiful Redemption (2012)

Bibliography

References

External links

 

2009 American novels
American young adult novels
Little, Brown and Company books
American fantasy novels adapted into films
Paranormal romance novels
Young adult fantasy novels